John Anthony Requejo, Jr. (born May 23, 1996)  is an American professional soccer player who plays for Flower City Union in the National Independent Soccer Association.

Career

Club
Requejo signed with Club Tijuana upon turning 18 in 2014, having previously signed a letter of intent to play for the University of California, Los Angeles. He was ranked as a top recruit in the class of 2014 by TopDrawerSoccer.

He made his professional debut in a Copa MX match against Coras de Tepic.

Requejo signed with Flower City Union for the 2023 NISA Season

International
Requejo was a regular for the United States U17 and has appeared with the United States U20 squad.

References

External links

1996 births
Living people
2015 CONCACAF U-20 Championship players
American expatriate soccer players
American soccer players
Association football defenders
Club Tijuana footballers
Expatriate footballers in Mexico
People from Carpinteria, California
Soccer players from California
Sportspeople from Santa Barbara County, California
United States men's under-20 international soccer players
United States men's youth international soccer players
LA Galaxy II players